Goodwin Island is one of the many uninhabited Canadian arctic islands in Qikiqtaaluk Region, Nunavut. It is located at the confluence of Hudson Strait and the Labrador Sea.

The island, a member of the Button Islands, is situated west-northwest of Lacy Island.

Other islands in the immediate vicinity include Erhardt Island, King Island, Lawson Island, MacColl Island, and Observation Island.

References 

Islands of Hudson Strait
Islands of the Labrador Sea
Uninhabited islands of Qikiqtaaluk Region